

The Fournier RF-47 is a 1990s French two-seat light aircraft designed and built by Avions Fournier.  First flown 9 April 1993, it is a low-wing tricycle landing gear monoplane.  The prototype was powered by a  Sauer modified Volkswagen air-cooled engine but it was intended that production aircraft would be fitted with a  Limbach L2400 engine with the Sauer engine as an option.  The RF-47 has an enclosed cockpit with side-by-side configuration seating for two under a single piece canopy, the canopy hinges at the rear.

Specifications (utility)

References

Bibliography

 

1990s French civil utility aircraft
Fournier aircraft
Single-engined tractor aircraft
Low-wing aircraft
Aircraft first flown in 1993